Samuel Hart may refer to:

 Samuel Hart (1747–1810), American merchant and politician
 Samuel Hart (priest) (1845–1917), American Episcopal clergyman
Samuel Hart (Family Affairs)
Sam Hart (born 1996), English footballer